The Anglican Theological Review is the "unofficial journal of the seminaries of the Episcopal Church in the United States and the Anglican Church of Canada." Issues include peer-reviewed articles, poetry submissions, and book reviews. The journal is indexed in L'Année philologique, Old Testament Abstracts, ATLA Religion Database and Modern Language Association Database. Current editors-in-chief are Jason Fout (Bexley Seabury Federation) and Scott MacDougall (Church Divinity School of the Pacific).

References

External links

Anglicanism
Christianity studies journals
Publications established in 1918
Quarterly journals
English-language journals